Claude Garamont (–1561), known commonly as Claude Garamond, was a French type designer, publisher and punch-cutter based in Paris. Garamond worked as an engraver of punches, the masters used to stamp matrices, the moulds used to cast metal type. He worked in the tradition now called old-style serif design, which produced letters with a relatively organic structure resembling handwriting with a pen but with a slightly more structured and upright design. Considered one of the leading type designers of all time, he is recognised to this day for the elegance of his typefaces. Many old-style serif typefaces are collectively known as Garamond, named after the designer.

Garamond was one of the first independent punchcutters, specialising in type design and punch-cutting as a service to others rather than working in house for a specific printer. His career therefore helped to define the future of commercial printing with typefounding as a distinct industry to printing books.

Early life and background

Garamond's early life has been the subject of some research and considerable uncertainty. Dates as early as 1480 and as late as  have been proposed for his birth, the latter being preferred by the French ministry of culture. In favour of a later date, his will of 1561 states that his mother was then still alive. He married twice, to Guillemette Gaultier and, after her death, to Ysabeau Le Fevre. Garamond may have apprenticed with Antoine Augereau and was perhaps also trained by Simon de Colines. He later worked with Geoffroy Tory, whose interests in humanist typography and the ancient Greek capital letterforms, or majuscules, may have informed Garamond's work.

Garamond came to prominence around 1540, when three of his Greek typefaces (now called the Grecs du roi (1541)) were requested for a royally-ordered book series by Robert Estienne. Garamond based these types on the handwriting of Angelo Vergecio, the King's Librarian at Fontainebleau. The result is an immensely complicated set of type, including a vast variety of alternate letters and ligatures to simulate the flexibility of handwriting.

Garamond worked for a variety of employers on commission, creating punches for publishers and the government. Garamond's typefaces were popular abroad, and replaced Griffo's original roman type at the Aldine Press in Venice. He also worked as a publisher and bookseller. While his italics have been considered less impressive than his roman typefaces, he was one of the early printers to establish the modern tradition that the italic capitals should slope as the lower case does, rather than remain upright as Roman square capitals do.

Although Garamond himself remains an eminent figure in French printing of the sixteenth century, historical research over the last century has increasingly placed his work in context. Garamond was one figure among many at a time when new typefaces were rapidly produced in sixteenth-century France, and these type designers operated within a pre-existing tradition defined by the work of figures such as Aldus Manutius who were active over the preceding half-century. The period from 1520 to around 1560, encompassing Garamond's career as an artisan, was an extremely busy period for typeface creation, with a wide range of fonts created, some apparently for exclusive use by a specific printer, others sold or traded between them. Many engravers were active over this time, including Garamond himself, Granjon, Guillaume Le Bé, Antoine Augereau, Simon de Colines, Pierre Haultin and others, creating typefaces not just in the Latin alphabet, but also in Greek and Hebrew for scholarly use. This period saw the creation of a pool of high-quality punches and matrices that would supply the French printing industry, to a large extent, for the next two centuries.

Despite Garamond's eminence, he was never particularly financially successful, perhaps due to a surfeit of competition and piracy in the Parisian book industry of the time. In 1545, Garamond entered the publishing trade in a partnership with Jean Barbé, a Parisian bookseller. The first book Garamond published was called, "Pia et Religiosa Meditatio" by David Chambellan.

Garamond's death and aftermath
By about 1561, Garamond had quietly died of unknown causes somewhere in France. In November 1561, following his death, his equipment, punches, and matrices were inventoried and sold off to purchasers including Guillaume Le Bé, Christophe Plantin, and André Wechel. His wife was forced to sell his punches, which caused the typefaces of Garamond to become widely used for two centuries, but often with attributions becoming highly confused. The chaotic sales caused problems, and Le Bé's son wrote to Plantin's successor Moretus offering to trade matrices so they could both have complementary type in a range of sizes. Egelhoff-Berner brought out a specimen in 1592 of types by Garamond and others, which would later be a source for many Garamond revivals.

The only major collection of original Garamond material in the Latin alphabet is that collected soon after his death by Christophe Plantin, based in Antwerp. This collection of punches and matrices now forms a major part of the collection of the Plantin-Moretus Museum in Antwerp, together with many other typefaces collected by Plantin from other typefounders of the period. The collection has been used extensively for research, for example by historians Harry Carter and H. D. L. Vervliet.

See also
 Garamond
 History of Western typography
 Movable type
 Printing Press
 Punchcutting
 Typesetting

Notes

References

Footnotes

Bibliography

 A survey of Claude Garamond's career and typefaces, of Robert Granjon's italic types which were combined with Garamond roman types, and a brief summary of subsequent revivals through Garamond Premier Pro.

External links

Claude Garamont
Font Designer – Claude Garamond

1490s births
1561 deaths
Businesspeople from Paris
French typographers and type designers
Year of birth uncertain
French publishers (people)